Little Georgetown is a small unincorporated community along the Potomac River in Berkeley County, West Virginia, United States. It is located northeast of Hedgesville and Georgetown.

Unincorporated communities in Berkeley County, West Virginia
Unincorporated communities in West Virginia
West Virginia populated places on the Potomac River